Mah Parwar Begum (died 13 December 1941) was the royal consort of Afghanistan. She belonged to the khel Babakar and was the third daughter of Sardar Muhammad Asif Khan and of his second wife, Murwarid Begum. She was the only wife of Mohammed Nadir Shah and the mother of Mohammed Zahir Shah, both Kings of Afghanistan. Her daughter Zamina Begum was the 1st First Lady of Afghanistan, as the spouse of Mohammed Daoud Khan.

Ancestry

References

Sources 
  Mah Parwar Begum

Afghan royal consorts
Pashtun women
1941 deaths
Year of birth missing
Afghan emigrants to Iran